Ice hockey was inducted at the Youth Olympic Games at the inaugural edition in 2012 for both boys and girls. One team competition and one individual skills challenge is open to every gender. In 2020, the skills challenge will be replaced by a mixed-NOC 3-on-3 tournament.

Boys

Tournament

3-on-3 cross ice tournament

Individual skills challenge

Girls

Tournament

3-on-3 cross ice tournament

Individual skills challenge

Medal table
As of the 2020 Winter Youth Olympics.

See also
Ice hockey at the Olympic Games

References

External links
Youth Olympic Games

Sports at the Winter Youth Olympics
Youth Olympics